Freeway Airport  is a privately owned airport located in Mitchellville, Prince George's County, Maryland, United States. It has Cessna 172s and a PA28R-200 IFR available to rent.

History 
Freeway Airport became active in June 1961, in Prince George's County, 2 miles NW of Mitchellville, Maryland. It has maintained an active flight school operation since its founding.

Hani Hanjour, one of the hijackers involved in the events of September 11, 2001, attempted to rent an aircraft at Freeway Airport after claiming to be qualified to do so. A month before the attack, "instructors at Freeway Airport in Bowie flew with him and deemed him unfit to rent a plane by himself".

Crashes and incidents
In February 2006, a Cessna 172 crashed at Freeway Airport due to poor visibility.

On September 3, 2013 a Mooney M20 had crashed while taking off from runway 36. The three people on board were badly injured.

On September 12, 2019, a small Mooney plane (N202JB) crashed on U.S. Route 50, striking a car. Two people aboard the plane suffered minor injuries but did not seek medical attention at a hospital, and two people in the car suffered minor injuries.

References

External links
Airport WebSite: Freeway Aviation

Airports in Maryland
Transportation buildings and structures in Prince George's County, Maryland
Airports established in 1961
1961 establishments in Maryland
Privately owned airports